I Woke Up One Morning is a British television sitcom which aired on BBC One in two series from 1985 to 1986.

Main cast
 Michael Angelis as Max 
 Peter Caffrey as Danny
 Robert Gillespie as Zero
 Frederick Jaeger as Derek
 Jonathan Kydd as Eddie
 Tim Potter as Irrelevant
 Jennifer Daniel as Isobel
 Shirin Taylor as Rosa
 Jean Boht as Mrs. Hamilton
 Marcia Warren as Doris
 Frances White as Sister May
 Barrie Gosney as Colin
 David Shaw Parker as Joey

References

Bibliography
 Horace Newcomb. Encyclopedia of Television. Routledge, 2014.

External links
 

1985 British television series debuts
1986 British television series endings
1980s British comedy television series
BBC television sitcoms
English-language television shows